American Eagles women's basketball team represents American University and plays its home games at Bender Arena in Washington D.C. It competes as part of the Patriot League in NCAA Division I. In 2015, it received its first ever bid in the NCAA Division I women's basketball tournament as a 14 seed after a 28–4 record and their first ever Patriot League tournament championship. They lost to #3 Iowa 75-67 in the First Round.

Current staff

Reference

Year-by-year records

Ref

NCAA Tournament appearances
The Eagles are 0-2 in NCAA Tournament appearances.

Stafford H. Cassell Hall of Fame
The Stafford H. Cassell Hall of Fame was introduced celebrate the rich history of American University Athletics. The following are some former members of the women's basketball team to be introduced into the Hall of Fame.

Inductees

See also
American Eagles men's basketball

References

External links